Kostović is a Croatian and Serbian surname. The surname may refer to:

 Dario Kostović (born 1980), Swiss-Croatian ice hockey player
 Ivica Kostović (born 1943), Croatian physician and politician
 Ognjeslav Kostović Stepanović (1851–1916), Serbian inventor

Croatian surnames
Serbian surnames